Edson de Jesus Nobre (born 2 March 1980), known simply as Edson, is an Angolan retired footballer who played mainly as a winger.

He spent most of his professional career in Portugal, mainly with Paços de Ferreira with which he appeared in the 2008–09 UEFA Cup.

Edson represented Angola at the 2006 World Cup.

Club career
Born in Benguela, Edson started his professional career in Portugal at the age of 19, going on to play lower league football with G.D. Mealhada and Anadia FC. In 2005, his third division performances with Oliveira do Bairro S.C. caught the attention of Primeira Liga club F.C. Paços de Ferreira.

Edson made his league debut against C.D. Nacional on 21 August 2005, playing the full 90 minutes in a 0–1 home loss. In his second season, as Paços reached the UEFA Cup for the first time ever, he scored four goals in 25 matches, but was never an undisputed starter in his four-year stay.

In the summer of 2009, Edson signed with Cyprus' Ethnikos Achna FC. However, this spell would be quite unsuccessful, and he returned to his country in the following transfer window, joining C.R.D. Libolo.

International career
An Angolan international since 2005, Edson was called up to the following year's Africa Cup of Nations and the FIFA World Cup. In the latter tournament, he played 20 minutes in the 1–0 defeat to Portugal in the group stage.

Edson also participated in the 2008 Africa Cup of Nations, coming on as a late substitute in the quarter-final match against Egypt, a 2–1 loss.

References

External links

1980 births
Living people
People from Benguela
Angolan footballers
Association football wingers
Association football forwards
Primeira Liga players
Segunda Divisão players
Anadia F.C. players
F.C. Paços de Ferreira players
F.C. Arouca players
Cypriot First Division players
Ethnikos Achna FC players
Girabola players
C.R.D. Libolo players
Angola international footballers
2006 FIFA World Cup players
2006 Africa Cup of Nations players
2008 Africa Cup of Nations players
Angolan expatriate footballers
Expatriate footballers in Portugal
Expatriate footballers in Cyprus
Angolan expatriate sportspeople in Portugal
Angolan expatriate sportspeople in Cyprus